The Kochkor is a river in Kochkor District of Naryn Province of Kyrgyzstan. It is formed by confluence of Karakol and Seok rivers. The Chu is formed by the confluence of Kochkor and Joon Aryk near the village Kochkor.

References

Rivers of Kyrgyzstan